42nd Street is a major crosstown street in the New York City borough of Manhattan, spanning the entire breadth of Midtown Manhattan, from  Turtle Bay at the East River, to Hell's Kitchen at the Hudson River on the West Side. The street hosts some of New York's best known landmarks, including (from east to west) the headquarters of the United Nations, the Chrysler Building, Grand Central Terminal, the New York Public Library Main Branch, Times Square, and the Port Authority Bus Terminal.  

The street is known for its theaters, especially near the intersection with Broadway at Times Square, and as such is also the name of the region of the theater district (and, at times, the red-light district) near that intersection.

History

Early history
During the American Revolutionary War, a cornfield near 42nd Street and Fifth Avenue was where General George Washington angrily attempted to rally his troops after the British landing at Kip's Bay, which scattered many of the American militiamen. Washington's attempt put him in danger of being captured, and his officers had to persuade him to leave. The rout eventually subsided into an orderly retreat.

John Jacob Astor purchased a  farm in 1803 that ran from 42nd Street to 46th Street west of Broadway to the Hudson River.

19th century 

In 1835, the city's Street Committee, after receiving numerous complaints about lack of access for development above 14th Street, decided to open up all lots which had already been plotted on the city grid up to 42nd Street, which thus became – for a time – the northern boundary of the city.

Cornelius Vanderbilt began the construction of Grand Central Depot in 1869 on 42nd Street at Fourth Avenue as the terminal for his Central, Hudson, Harlem and New Haven commuter rail lines, because city regulations required that trains be pulled by horse below 42nd Street. The Depot, which opened in 1871, was replaced by Grand Central Terminal in 1913.

Between the 1870s and 1890s, 42nd Street became the uptown boundary of the mainstream theatre district, which started around 23rd Street, as the entertainment district of the Tenderloin gradually moved northward.

Early 20th century 
42nd Street was developed relatively late compared to other crosstown thoroughfares such as 14th Street and 23rd Street, which had grown during the American Civil War, and 57th Street, which became prominent in the 1890s. It was only after the beginning of the 20th century that the street saw entertainment venues being developed around Times Square and upscale office space around Grand Central Terminal.

The corner of 42nd Street and Broadway, at the southeast corner of Times Square, is the eastern terminus of the Lincoln Highway, the first road across the United States, which was conceived and mapped in 1913.

An elevated railroad line, running above East 42nd Street from Third Avenue to the Grand Central station, was closed in 1923, leading to the development of such structures as the Chanin Building and 110 East 42nd Street west of Lexington Avenue. The street east of Lexington Avenue continued to be made up of mostly low-rise buildings; these blocks were adjacent to the Second Avenue and Third Avenue elevated lines, and accordingly, initially considered unattractive for major development. By the 1920s, The New York Times reported that several high-rise developments were "radically changing the old-time conditions" along East 42nd Street, including the Chanin, Lincoln, Chrysler, and Daily News Buildings, as well as Tudor City.

Theatrical decline 
West 42nd Street, meanwhile, prospered as a theater and entertainment district until World War II. According to historian Robert A. M. Stern, West 42nd Street's decline started in 1946, when the streetcars on 42nd Street were replaced by less efficient buses.

Lloyd Bacon and Busby Berkeley's 1933 film musical 42nd Street, starring 30s heartthrobs Dick Powell and Ruby Keeler, displays the bawdy and colorful mixture of Broadway denizens and lowlifes in Manhattan during the Depression. In 1980, it was turned into a successful Broadway musical which ran until 1989, and which was revived for a four-year run in 2001. In the words of the Al Dubin and Harry Warren title song, on 42nd Street one could find:

Little  from the Fifties, innocent and sweet,

Sexy ladies from the Eighties who are indiscreet,

They're side by side, they're glorified,

Where the underworld can meet the elite

Naughty, gawdy, bawdy, sporty, Forty-second Street!

From the late 1950s until the late 1980s, 42nd Street, nicknamed the "Deuce", was the cultural center of American grindhouse theaters, which spawned an entire subculture. The book Sleazoid Express, a travelogue of the 42nd Street grindhouses and the films they showed, describes the unique blend of people who made up the theater-goers:

depressives hiding from jobs, sexual obsessives, inner-city people seeking cheap diversions, teenagers skipping school, adventurous couples on dates, couples-chasers peeking on them, people getting high, homeless people sleeping, pickpockets...

While the street outside the theatres was populated with:

phony drug salesman ... low-level drug dealers, chain snatchers ... [j]unkies alone in their heroin/cocaine dreamworld ... predatory chickenhawks spying on underage trade looking for pickups ... male prostitutes of all ages ... [t]ranssexuals, hustlers, and closety gays with a fetishistic homo- or heterosexual itch to scratch ... It was common to see porn stars whose films were playing at the adult houses promenade down the block. ... Were you a freak? Not when you stepped onto the Deuce. Being a freak there would get you money, attention, entertainment, a starring part in a movie. Or maybe a robbery and a beating.

For much of the mid and late 20th century, the area of 42nd Street near Times Square was home to activities often considered unsavory, including peep shows.

East 42nd Street was, for some time, spared from similar decline, especially east of Third Avenue, where the development of the United Nations supported a thriving business district and prompted the widening of that section of 42nd Street. The demolition of the Second and Third Avenue elevated lines by the 1950s led to increased development on East 42nd Street, such as annexes to the Chrysler and Daily News Buildings, as well as the construction of the Socony–Mobil and Ford Foundation Buildings. By the 1960s, East 42nd Street between Park and Second Avenues contained more headquarters of industries than any other place in the United States except Chicago or Pittsburgh. During this time, there was much development outside the rundown entertainment district of Times Square, somewhat offsetting the perception of that part of 42nd Street.

Revitalization 
In the early 1990s, city government encouraged a cleanup of the Times Square area. In 1990, the city government took over six of the historic theatres on the block of 42nd Street between Seventh and Eighth Avenues, and New 42nd Street, a not-for-profit organization, was formed to oversee their renovation and reuse, as well as to construct new theatres and a rehearsal space. In 1993, Disney Theatrical Productions bought the New Amsterdam Theatre, which it renovated a few years later. Since the mid-1990s, the block has again become home to mainstream theatres and several multi-screen mainstream movie theatres, along with shops, restaurants, hotels, and attractions such as Madame Tussauds wax museum and Ripley's Believe It or Not that draw millions to the city every year. This area is now co-signed as "New 42nd Street" to signify this change.

In the 1990s, the renovation of Bryant Park between Fifth and Sixth Avenues, as well as the renovations of Times Square and Grand Central Terminal, led to increases in office occupancy along both sections of 42nd Street.

Notable places
(from East to West):
 Headquarters of the United Nations, First Avenue
 Tudor City apartments, First Avenue
 Ford Foundation Building, between First and Second Avenues, former site of the Hospital for the Ruptured and Crippled (now known as the Hospital for Special Surgery)
 Church of the Covenant, between First and Second Avenues
 Daily News Building, Second Avenue
 Socony–Mobil Building, between Third and Lexington Avenues
 Chrysler Building, Lexington Avenue
 Chanin Building, Lexington Avenue
 110 East 42nd Street (formerly Bowery Savings Bank Building, now Cipriani S.A.), between Lexington and Park Avenues
 Pershing Square Building, Park Avenue
 Pershing Square, Park Avenue
 Grand Central Terminal, Park Avenue
 One Grand Central Place, Vanderbilt Avenue
 One Vanderbilt, Vanderbilt Avenue
 500 Fifth Avenue
 New York Public Library Main Branch, Fifth Avenue
 W. R. Grace Building, between Fifth and Sixth Avenues
 Salmon Tower Building, between Fifth and Sixth Avenues
 Aeolian Building, between Fifth and Sixth Avenues
 Bryant Park, between Fifth and Sixth Avenues
 Shayne's Emporium, west of Sixth Avenue
 Bank of America Tower, Sixth Avenue
 Bush Tower, between Sixth and Seventh Avenues
 4 Times Square, at Broadway
 The Knickerbocker Hotel, at Broadway
 One Times Square, the building from which the ball drops on New Year's Eve, Broadway and Seventh Avenue
 Times Square Tower, Broadway and Seventh Avenue
 3 Times Square, at Seventh Avenue
 5 Times Square, at Seventh Avenue
 New Amsterdam Theatre, between Seventh and Eighth Avenues
 New Victory Theatre, between Seventh and Eighth Avenues
 American Airlines Theatre and New 42nd Street, between Seventh and Eighth Avenues
 Candler Building, between Seventh and Eighth Avenues
 Empire Theatre, between Seventh and Eighth Avenues
 Port Authority Bus Terminal, at Eighth Avenue
 Eleven Times Square, at Eighth Avenue
 330 West 42nd Street, formerly McGraw-Hill Building, between Eighth and Ninth Avenues
 Holy Cross Church, between Eighth and Ninth Avenues
 Theatre Row, between Ninth and Eleventh Avenues
 Silver Towers apartments, at Eleventh Avenue
Atelier Skyscraper Condominium, between Eleventh and Twelfth Avenue
 Circle Line Sightseeing Cruises ferry terminal, Twelfth Avenue

Transportation

Subway
Every New York City Subway line that crosses 42nd Street has a stop on 42nd Street:
 
 
 

There are two subway lines under 42nd Street. The 42nd Street Shuttle runs under 42nd Street between Broadway/Seventh Avenue (Times Square) and Park Avenue (Grand Central). The IRT Flushing Line curves from Eleventh Avenue to 41st Street, under which it runs until Fifth Avenue; shifts to 42nd Street between Fifth and Madison Avenues; and continues under the East River to Queens.

In the past, every former IRT elevated line had a station at 42nd Street:
 42nd Street on the IRT Second Avenue Line
 42nd Street on the IRT Third Avenue Line
 42nd Street on the IRT Sixth Avenue Line
 42nd Street on the IRT Ninth Avenue Line

A fifth station extended over 42nd Street as a western spur from the Third Avenue Line to Grand Central Depot, later Grand Central Station, and finally Grand Central Terminal.

Bus
MTA Regional Bus Operations's M42 bus runs the length of 42nd Street between the Circle Line Sightseeing Cruises ferry terminal on the Hudson River and the headquarters of the United Nations on the East River. Its predecessor, the 42nd Street Crosstown Line streetcar, had used 42nd Street. In 2019, bus lanes were installed along the length of the street.

42nd Street is also used by the  Staten Island express buses.

In popular culture

 The George M. Cohan song "Give My Regards to Broadway" includes the lyrics "Tell all the gang at Forty-Second Street / That I will soon be there".
 The Jim Croce song "You Don't Mess Around with Jim" includes the lyrics "42nd street got Big Jim Walker, he a pool shootin' son of a gun..."
 The Billy Joel song "Miami 2017 (Seen the Lights Go Out on Broadway)" includes the lyrics "We'd seen it all the time on 42nd Street..."
 The Scorpions song "The Zoo" talks about the busy nightlife in New York; it includes the lyrics "Enjoy the Zoo, walk down 42nd Street".
 The Bleachers song "Goodmorning" references "the kids at 42" who helped him out at one point in his life.
 The Don McLean song "Sister Fatima" on American Pie mentions 42nd Street as a way to set the scene of New York in the 1960s.
 The title track of rapper Kurtis Blow's second album Deuce also refers to the street and its nightlife.
 The novel Our Lady of the Inferno is largely set against the backdrop of 1980s 42nd Street; multiple reviews praised the book for its attention to detail in accurately recreating the environment as it existed.
 The Beastie Boys songs "She's Crafty" and "Hold It Now, Hit It" include the lyrics "I think I thought I seen her on eighth and forty-deuce" and "I'm a peep-show seeking on the forty-deuce", respectively.
 The Kansas song "Down the Road", from the 1975 album Song for America, includes the lyrics "The kind of freaks that hang out on 42nd Street".
 The 1994 Louis Malle film Vanya on 42nd Street is about a group of actors attempting to perform the play Uncle Vanya in the (then) dilapidated New Amsterdam Theatre
 The 42nd Street Subway Station is featured in Street Fighter III: Third Strike as the "Subway Station" stage. There are two versions of the stage, which are used for the characters Alex and Ken Masters, respectively. Alex's version is set at 1:31 AM and has a bright orange tint, as opposed to Ken's version, which is set at 9:27 PM and has a blue tint. The former also has construction equipment all over the place whereas the latter is clear.
In addition, "forty-deuce" is street slang for Manhattan's former live peep show district on 42nd Street. The following works reference the phrase "forty-deuce":
 Forty Deuce, 1982 film
 The Deuce, 2017 TV series

See also

 Theater District, Manhattan
 Times Square

References
Notes

Bibliography
 
 

Further reading
 Bianco, Anthony (2004). Ghosts of 42nd Street: A History of America's Most Infamous Block. New York: HarperCollins Books, . (A detailed history that focuses primarily on the Times Square Theater District from the beginning of the 20th century through its successful restoration and in the late 20th century.)
 Eliot, Marc (2001). Down 42nd Street: Sex, money, culture and politics at the crossroads of the world. New York: Warner Books, . (A detailed history that focuses on the social, political and cultural aspects of the street, primarily between 7th and 8th Avenues.)

External links

 42nd Street: A New York Songline – virtual walking tour
 

 
Hell's Kitchen, Manhattan
42nd
042
Times Square